Los Reyes is a street-level station along Line A of the Mexico City Metro.  It is located in the Colonia Los Reyes Acaquilpan neighborhood in La Paz municipio in the State of Mexico adjacent to Mexico City.

The station logo depicts three crowns as worn by the Three Wise Men or Kings, since Los Reyes means "The Kings".

Ridership

Exits
North: Porfirio Díaz street, Col. Los Reyes Acaquilpan
South: Pensador Mexicano Juárez, Col. Valle de los Remedios

Gallery

References

External links
 

Reyes, Los
La Paz, State of Mexico
Railway stations opened in 1991
1991 establishments in Mexico
Mexico City Metro stations outside Mexico City